Miguel Santos Soares known as Migi (born July 4, 1984) is a football player. He is the current defender for the Timor-Leste national football team.

References

External links

1984 births
Living people
East Timorese footballers
East Timorese men's futsal players
Association football defenders
Timor-Leste international footballers